Alector (Ancient Greek: Ἀλέκτωρ) refers to more than one person in classical mythology and history:

Alector, son of Magnes and Meliboea, eponyms of Magnesia and the town of Meliboea respectively.
Alector, the Boeotian father of Leitus. Homer calls him "Alectryon", and Diodorus "Electryon", naming him among the sons of Itonus. According to Tzetzes, Alector was also the father of Clonius, Arcesilaus and Prothoenor (his nephews according to Diodorus) by different mothers: he is said to have fathered Leitus with Polybule, Arcesilaus with Cleobule, Prothoenor with Arteis, and Clonius with Acteis.
Alector, an Elean prince as the son of King Epeius, and brother of Hyrmine. He was allied with Phorbas of Thessaly. By the latter's daughter Diogeneia, he became father of Amarynceus.
Alector, the Argive son of Anaxagoras and father of King Iphis of Argos.
Alector of Sparta, son of Argeus (son of Pelops) and Hegesandra, daughter of King Amyclas. He has two brothers, Melanion and Boethoos. Alector was the father of Iphiloche (or Echemela), who married Megapenthes, son of Menelaus.

Notes

References 

 Apollodorus, The Library with an English Translation by Sir James George Frazer, F.B.A., F.R.S. in 2 Volumes, Cambridge, MA, Harvard University Press; London, William Heinemann Ltd. 1921. . Online version at the Perseus Digital Library. Greek text available from the same website.
Diodorus Siculus, The Library of History translated by Charles Henry Oldfather. Twelve volumes. Loeb Classical Library. Cambridge, Massachusetts: Harvard University Press; London: William Heinemann, Ltd. 1989. Vol. 3. Books 4.59–8. Online version at Bill Thayer's Web Site
 Diodorus Siculus, Bibliotheca Historica. Vol 1–2. Immanel Bekker. Ludwig Dindorf. Friedrich Vogel. in aedibus B. G. Teubneri. Leipzig. 1888–1890. Greek text available at the Perseus Digital Library.
 Homer, The Iliad with an English Translation by A.T. Murray, Ph.D. in two volumes. Cambridge, MA., Harvard University Press; London, William Heinemann, Ltd. 1924. Online version at the Perseus Digital Library.
 Homer, Homeri Opera in five volumes. Oxford, Oxford University Press. 1920. Greek text available at the Perseus Digital Library.
 Homer, The Odyssey with an English Translation by A.T. Murray, PH.D. in two volumes. Cambridge, MA., Harvard University Press; London, William Heinemann, Ltd. 1919. Online version at the Perseus Digital Library. Greek text available from the same website.
 Pausanias, Description of Greece with an English Translation by W.H.S. Jones, Litt.D., and H.A. Ormerod, M.A., in 4 Volumes. Cambridge, MA, Harvard University Press; London, William Heinemann Ltd. 1918. . Online version at the Perseus Digital Library
Pausanias, Graeciae Descriptio. 3 vols. Leipzig, Teubner. 1903.  Greek text available at the Perseus Digital Library.
Tzetzes, John, Allegories of the Iliad translated by Goldwyn, Adam J. and Kokkini, Dimitra. Dumbarton Oaks Medieval Library, Harvard University Press, 2015. 

Kings of Argos
Kings in Greek mythology
Argive characters in Greek mythology
Boeotian characters in Greek mythology
Elean characters in Greek mythology
Laconian characters in Greek mythology